In Spanish language a ventisquero is a zone in a mountain where heavy snow accumulations occur. Before the term glaciar (Spanish for glacier) became widespread many glaciers in Patagonia were titled with ventisquero, such as Ventisquero Negro or Grandes Ventisqueros.

Spanish words and phrases
Glaciology